Laëtitia Kamba (born January 10, 1987) is a French basketball player who plays for club Cavigal Nice Basket of the Cavigal Nice Basket.

References

French women's basketball players
1987 births
Basketball players from Paris
Living people
Basketball players at the 2016 Summer Olympics
Olympic basketball players of France
Forwards (basketball)
France women's national basketball team players